Stan Tolhurst was an Australian actor, technician and filmmaker. He worked as a dancer on stage before joining Cinesound Productions for whom he would add humour to newsreels. He also worked as a producer and ran a film studio.

Select Credits
The Burgomeister (1935) – actor
Phantom Gold (1937) – actor, producer
Let George Do It (1938) – actor
This Place Australia (1938) (shorts) – producer
Below the Surface (1938) – actor, producer
Bush Christmas (1947)

References

External links
Stanley Tolhurst at National Film and Sound Archive

Australian male actors